The  were limited express electric multiple unit (EMU) train types operated by the private railway operator Tobu Railway in Japan from July 1991 until March 2022. Rebuilt from former 1800 series express sets, the trains were used on limited express and charter services on the Tobu Skytree Line and Tobu Nikko Line.

Operations
, the fleet consists of three four-car 350 series sets (sets 351 to 353). The 350 series sets are normally used on Shimotsuke limited express services, while the 300 series was used on Kirifuri limited express services.

Formations
The six-car 300 series and four-car 350 series sets were formed as shown below.

300 series sets 301 to 302

Car 2 was fitted with a scissors-type pantograph, and car 4 was fitted with two.

350 series sets 351 to 353

Car 2 was fitted with two scissors-type pantographs.

Interior

History
Two 300 series six-car sets were built in 1990 from former 1800 series express EMUs displaced by the arrival of new 200 series EMUs. Three 350 series four-car sets were similarly rebuilt in 1991, with the trains entering service from the start of the revised timetable on 21 July 1991.
The 300 series six-car sets were withdrawn on 20 April 2017, following the introduction of the Tobu 500 series. On 6 March 2022, the 350 series four-car sets were also withdrawn from service, alongside the discontinuation of Kirifuri limited express services.

References

External links

 Tobu 300/350 series 

Electric multiple units of Japan
300 series
Train-related introductions in 1991
1500 V DC multiple units of Japan